Li Na (李娜, born 1982) is a former Chinese professional tennis player.

Li Na may also refer to:

Li Na (Tang dynasty) (李纳, 758–792), general
Li Na (daughter of Mao Zedong) (李讷, born 1940), daughter of Mao Zedong
Li Na (singer) (李娜, born 1963), Chinese singer
Li Na (fencer) (李娜, born 1981), Chinese fencer
Li Na (cyclist) (李娜, born 1982), Chinese 2002 world champion in keirin track cycle racing
Li Na (diver) (李娜, born 1984), Chinese diver who won a gold and silver medal at the 2000 Summer Olympics

References

See also
Lee Na-eun (이나은, 李娜恩)
Lina (disambiguation)
Nali (disambiguation)